The View From Here was a column by Loudon Wainwright Jr. that appeared in Life magazine for many years. Wainwright wrote the column for 24 years until his death in 1988 at the age of 63. The column has been described as "always a pleasing paradox, a self-revealing and even confessional voice, thoughtful, concerned and unpretentious, amid the collective grandeurs of photo-journalism."

Loudon Wainwright III, one of Loudon Wainwright Jr.'s children, has read passages from the column in his live performances, juxtaposing them with various songs he has written.

Google recently made many years of Life magazine available through Google Books. The tables below link to many of the columns throughout the years at Google books.

1964

1965

1966

1967

1968

1969

1972

References

Life (magazine)